Dario Voltolini (Turin, 1959) is an Italian writer. His style has often been described as "minimalism", though the author describes his writing as spontaneous and far from the patiently  refined work of minimalism master Raymond Carver.

Biography  
After graduating in Turin, he was co-founder of the blog Nazione Indiana, a collective whose members include writers and intellectuals. He has written many novels and short stories and teaches at the writing school Scuola Holden in Turin. He collaborates to the section Tuttolibri in the Italian newspaper La Stampa.

Works 
 Una intuizione metropolitana, Bollati Boringhieri, 1990
 Di case e di cortili. Il Borgo Nuovo e via della Rocca in Torino, edited by B. Sacerdoti, Pluriverso, 1993
 Rincorse, Einaudi, 1994
 Neve (with Julian Schnabel), Hopefulmonster, 1996
 Forme d'onda, Feltrinelli, 1996; Laurana 2014
 Onde, RadioRai, 1996
 Fantasia della giornata, Morgana, 1997
 Le lontananze accanto a noi, RAI, 1997
 Glunk, Portofranco-Fabiani, 1998
 Il grande fiume. Impressioni sul delta del Po, Fernandel, 1998
 In gita a Torino con Dario Voltolini,  /Scriptorium, 1998
 10, Feltrinelli, 2000
 Velasco. Isolitudine. Catalogo della mostra (with Ferdinando Scianna), Charta, 2000
 Primaverile (uomini nudi al testo), Feltrinelli, 2001
 Signora, (with Rivka Rinn), Edizioni Canopo, 2002
 I confini di Torino, Quiritta, 2003
 Sotto i cieli d'Italia (with Giulio Mozzi), Sironi, 2004
 Il tempo della luce, Effigie, 2005
 Le scimmie sono inavvertitamente uscite dalla gabbia, Fandango, 2006
 Mille stelle, (with Nicola De Maria), Hopefulmonster, 2006
 Torino fatta ad arte, (with Giacomo Soffiantino), EDT, 2007
 Fabio, Manni, 2008
 Foravìa, Feltrinelli, 2010
 Corso Svizzera 49 (with Giosetta Fioroni), Frullini edizioni, 2011
 Da costa a costa (with Lorenzo Bracco), BookSprintEdizioni, 2012
 Oltre le Colonne d'Ercole (with Lorenzo Bracco), BookSprintEdizioni, 2014
 Autunnale (dalla finestra sul teatro), BookSprintEdizioni, 2015
 Pacific Palisades, Einaudi, 2017

Works translated into English 
 "An Ordinary Evening"—translated by Stiliana Milkova, Translation Review 101 (2018)
"Saturday" - translated by Stiliana Milkova, Inventory 7 (2017)
 "Beatrixpark: an Illumination" - translated by Anne Milano Appel, Harper's Magazine (October 2011)
 "That's Enough, Paolo" - translated by Stiliana Milkova, Asymptote (January 2018)
 "Berenice and the Taboo: On Italo Calvino's Invisible Cities" - translated by Stiliana Milkova, The Wilder Voice (Winter 2017) vol. 13, issue 24.

References 

1959 births
Living people
Italian male writers